Nevena Lenđel (born 18 July 1979) is a retired Croatian high jumper.

She won the bronze medal at the 1998 World Junior Championships and the 2001 Summer Universiade. She also competed at the 1999 World Championships, the 2000 and 2002 European Indoor Championships and the 2002 European Championships without reaching the final.

Her personal best jump was 1.91 metres, achieved in August 1999 in Gothenburg.

Competition record

References

1979 births
Living people
Croatian female high jumpers
Universiade medalists in athletics (track and field)
Southern Methodist University alumni
Croatian expatriate sportspeople in the United States
Mediterranean Games silver medalists for Croatia
Mediterranean Games medalists in athletics
Athletes (track and field) at the 1997 Mediterranean Games
Athletes (track and field) at the 2001 Mediterranean Games
Universiade bronze medalists for Croatia
Medalists at the 2001 Summer Universiade
21st-century Croatian women